The Hoogovens Wijk aan Zee Steel Chess Tournament 1991 was the 53rd edition of the Wijk aan Zee Chess Tournament. It was held in Wijk aan Zee in January 1991 and was won by the previous year's champion John Nunn.

{| class="wikitable" style="text-align: center;"
|+ 53rd Hoogovens tournament, group A, 17 January – 3 February 1991, Wijk aan Zee, Netherlands, Category XIV (2584)
! !! Player !! Rating !! 1 !! 2 !! 3 !! 4 !! 5 !! 6 !! 7 !! 8 !! 9 !! 10 !! 11 !! 12 !! 13 !! 14 !! Total !! TPR !! Place
|-
|-style="background:#ccffcc;"
| 1 || align=left| || 2600 ||  || ½ || ½ || ½ || 1 || ½ || 0 || ½ || ½ || ½ || 1 || 1 || 1 || 1 || 8½ || 2693 || 1
|-
| 2 || align="left" | || 2600 || ½ ||  || ½ || ½ || 1 || 0 || 1 || ½ || 1 || 1 || ½ || 1 || 0 || ½ || 8 || 2670 || 2–5
|-
| 3 || align="left" | || 2610 || ½ || ½ ||  || ½ || ½ || ½ || ½ || ½ || 1 || ½ || ½ || 1 || 1 || ½ || 8 || 2669 || 2–5
|-
| 4 || align="left" | || 2640 || ½ || ½ || ½ ||  || 0 || ½ || ½ || 1 || ½ || ½ || 1 || ½ || 1 || 1 || 8 || 2667 || 2–5
|-
| 5 || align="left" | || 2565 || 0 || 0 || ½ || 1 ||  || ½ || ½ || ½ || 1 || ½ || 1 || ½ || 1 || 1 || 8 || 2673 || 2–5
|-
| 6 || align="left" | || 2550 || ½ || 1 || ½ || ½ || ½ ||  || 1 || 1 || ½ || ½ || 0 || 0 || ½ || 1 || 7½ || 2644 || 6–8
|-
| 7 || align="left" | || 2645 || 1 || 0 || ½ || ½ || ½ || 0 ||  || ½ || ½ || 1 || ½ || 1 || 1 || ½ || 7½ || 2637 || 6–8
|-
| 8 || align="left" | || 2595 || ½ || ½ || ½ || 0 || ½ || 0 || ½ ||  || ½ || 1 || 1 || 1 || ½ || 1 || 7½ || 2640 || 6–8
|-
| 9 || align="left" | || 2530 || ½ || 0 || 0 || ½ || 0 || ½ || ½ || ½ ||  || ½ || ½ || ½ || ½ || 1 || 5½ || 2531 || 9
|-
| 10 || align="left" | || 2550 || ½ || 0 || ½ || ½ || ½ || ½ || 0 || 0 || ½ ||  || 1 || ½ || ½ || 0 || 5 || 2500 || 10–12
|-
| 11 || align="left" | || 2555 || 0 || ½ || ½ || 0 || 0 || 1 || ½ || 0 || ½ || 0 ||  || ½ || ½ || 1 || 5 || 2500 || 10–12
|- 
| 12 || align="left" | || 2580 || 0 || 0 || 0 || ½ || ½ || 1 || 0 || 0 || ½ || ½ || ½ ||  || ½ || 1 || 5 || 2498 || 10–12
|-
| 13 || align="left" | || 2570 || 0 || 1 || 0 || 0 || 0 || ½ || 0 || ½ || ½ || ½ || ½ || ½ ||  || ½ || 4½ || 2475 || 13
|-
| 14 || align="left" | || 2590 || 0 || ½ || ½ || 0 || 0 || 0 || ½ || 0 || 0 || 1 || 0 || 0 || ½ ||  || 3 || 2373 || 14
|}

References

Tata Steel Chess Tournament
1991 in chess
1991 in Dutch sport